The  is a minivan with two rear sliding doors built by Toyota and sold mainly in Asian countries. It is positioned below the Estima and Alphard, and above the Sienta. Being a front-wheel drive-based vehicle, it replaces the rear-wheel drive-based TownAce/LiteAce Noah, while retaining the "R" model code series and generation numbering. It was marketed as the more luxurious version of the Noah, sported a different grille design and more upmarket interior. Since 2022, the Noah is also rebadged and sold by Suzuki as the fourth-generation , which replaced the previous Nissan Serena-based model.

Up until the third generation, the vehicle was specifically developed to provide variants that complies with the Japanese dimension regulations for compact vehicles with length dimensions under  and width under  ("class five" vehicle), which placed it in the lower end of the annual road tax bracket which contributed to its high demand. Since the fourth generation, all variants have exceeded the  width limit, which made it classified as a "class three" vehicle.

The Noah was once exclusive to Toyota Corolla Store Japanese dealerships, the Voxy to Netz Store, and the Esquire to Toyopet Store. On 1 May 2020, the Noah, Voxy, and Esquire became available at all Toyota dealership sales channels in Japan (Toyota Store, Toyopet Store, Corolla Store and Netz). The Esquire was later discontinued in December 2021.



First generation (R60; 2001) 

The first-generation Noah and Voxy were released in November 2001. The facelift model was released in August 2004, and discontinued in June 2007.

Gallery 
Noah

Voxy

Second generation (R70; 2007) 

The second-generation Noah and Voxy were released in June 2007. The facelift model was released in April 2010, and discontinued in January 2014.

For 2007 models on Japanese models only, G-BOOK, a subscription telematics service was available as an option.

Indonesia 
In Indonesia, the facelifted second-generation Noah was launched on 11 December 2012 as the Toyota NAV1, which filled the gap between the Kijang Innova and the Alphard. It was CKD-assembled at Sugity Creatives, a subsidiary of Toyota Auto Body in Bekasi, West Java, and available in two grade levels, G and V. The engine used is the 2.0-litre 3ZR-FAE four-cylinder petrol unit mated with a continuously variable transmission. In 2014, the V Limited grade was added.

After the NAV1 was discontinued in January 2017 due to declining sales, it was replaced by the facelifted third-generation Voxy in August of the same year, which is imported from Japan. A total of 4,483 NAV1s were sold.

Gallery 
Noah

Voxy

NAV1 (Indonesia)

Third generation (R80; 2014) 

The third-generation Noah and Voxy were introduced in January 2014. For the first time, an engine start-stop system was used to improve fuel economy. It was also the first Toyota minivan to have one-touch sliding doors. In October 2014, the Esquire was launched, which was marketed as a more luxurious version of the Noah. The Noah/Voxy/Esquire also received Toyota's T-Connect services as well as Toyota Safety Sense C which incorporated features such as collision warning, lane assist, as well as high beam assist.

The Noah/Voxy/Esquire received a facelift on 3 July 2017 with changes to the lights, bonnet (hood), bumper and the front fender, and was discontinued in late 2021.

Indonesia 
The facelifted third-generation Voxy was launched in Indonesia on 10 August 2017. Unlike the preceding NAV1, which was assembled locally, the Voxy was imported from Japan. Export to Indonesia began in July 2017. It was only offered in one grade equivalent to the Japanese ZS grade.

Gallery 
Noah

Voxy

Esquire

Fourth generation (R90; 2022) 

The fourth-generation Noah and Voxy were introduced on 13 January 2022, which are built on the GA-C platform. The Esquire nameplate was not continued in this generation. The Noah is offered in X, G, Z, S-G, and S-Z grade levels, while the Voxy is only available in S-G and S-Z grades. The Noah is also marketed by Suzuki in Japan as the fourth-generation Suzuki Landy since 8 August 2022 through an OEM agreement. For the first time, the Noah no longer wears the stylized 'N' insignia on the front end, with Toyota's corporate emblem replacing it.

Indonesia 
The fourth-generation Voxy was launched in Indonesia on 17 February 2022. Like the previous model, it is only offered in one grade with Toyota Safety Sense as standard equipment.

Gallery 
Noah

Voxy

Suzuki Landy

Sales

References

External links 

  (Noah)
  (Voxy, Japan)
  (Voxy, Indonesia)

Noah
Cars introduced in 2001
2010s cars
2020s cars
Minivans
Front-wheel-drive vehicles
All-wheel-drive vehicles
Vehicles with CVT transmission
Hybrid minivans
Partial zero-emissions vehicles
Cars powered by transverse 4-cylinder engines